Fiji Village (stylised Fijivillage) is an online news website in Fiji which is fully owned and operated by Communications Fiji Limited. It covers local, political, business, sporting, cultural, and other news items.

Fiji Village is affiliated with radio stations FM96, Viti FM, Navtarang, Radio Sargam and Legend FM.

See also
Culture of Fiji

References

External links
 Fiji Village website

Fijian culture
Newspapers published in Fiji